1981 in professional wrestling describes the year's events in the world of professional wrestling.

List of notable promotions 
These promotions held notable shows in 1981.

Calendar of notable shows

Accomplishments and tournaments

JCP

AJPW

NJPW

Awards and honors

Pro Wrestling Illustrated

Wrestling Observer Newsletter

Births

January 11 - King Mo 
January 12: 
Jeet Rama
Krissy Vaine 
January 13 – Shad Gaspard (died in 2020) 
January 17 - Adam Windsor (died in 2022) 
January 26 – Volador Jr.
February 9 - Daisuke Sekimoto 
February 14 - Ayako Hamada
February 18 - Larry Sweeney (died in 2011) 
February 19 – Tye Dillinger
February 26 - Kaori Yoneyama 
March 2 – Lance Cade (died in 2010)
March 3 – Justin Gabriel
March 12 – Hideo Itami
April 4 – Tigre Uno 
April 28 - Alex Riley 
April 29 - Neil Faith
May 13 – Jimmy Yang
May 22 – Daniel Bryan
June 2 – Velvet Sky
July 8 - Luke Hawx 
July 22 
 Fandango
 Kenny King
July 25 – Finn Bálor
August 14 – Kofi Kingston
August 19 – Percy Watson
August 20 – Byron Saxton
August 21 – Trent Seven
August 26 - Petey Williams 
September 6 - Chris the Bambi Killer
September 10 - Rain 
September 13 – Angelina Love
September 26 – Asuka
October 7 - Thunder (died in 2016) 
October 9 - Daniel Puder 
October 11 - Arturo Ruas
November 1 - Hallowicked
November 3 – Jackie Gayda
November 10 – Ryback
November 28 – Erick Rowan
December 7 - Luster the Legend
December 11 - Fuego
December 14 - Johnny Jeter
December 17 - Tim Wiese
December 18 - Eddie Kingston 
December 23 - Arik Cannon 
December 25 - Rhaka Khan 
December 31 – Martin Stone

Debuts
Uncertain debut date
 King Kong Bundy
 El Dandy
 Jake Milliman 
 Wendell Cooley

Retirements
 Black Shadow (1942 - 1981)
 Tony Borne (1952 - 1981)
 Verne Gagne (1949 - 1981)
 Dutch Savage (1962 - 1981)
 The Missouri Mauler (1950 - 1981)

Deaths
 January 24 - Orville Brown, 72 
 February 6 - Goga Pehlwan, 43
 April 9 - Wee Willie Davis, 74
 April 12 - Joe Louis, 66
 August 12 – Buddy Austin, 52
 August 24 - Mike Marino, 59
 November 16 - Ali Baba (wrestler), 80

References

 
professional wrestling